The Western three-toothed land snail (Triodopsis occidentalis), is a species of air-breathing land snail, which is a terrestrial pulmonate gastropod mollusk in the family Polygyridae. This species is endemic to the United States.

References

Polygyridae
Gastropods described in 1894
Endemic fauna of the United States
Taxonomy articles created by Polbot